Holi is a 1984 Indian coming-of-age drama film directed by Ketan Mehta, whose socially conscious work has been compared to American director Spike Lee. It is based on eponymous play by Marathi writer, Mahesh Elkunchwar. The film starred Aamir Khan, Ashutosh Gowariker, Om Puri, Shreeram Lagoo, Deepti Naval, Meena Phatak and Naseeruddin Shah.

Plot
In a typical college in a typical Indian city, the hostel boys Madan Sharma (Aamir Khan) and his friends including Ranjeet Prakash (Ashutosh Gowariker) are a rowdy and troublesome lot. But on one day, when Madan and his friends find out there will not be a holiday for them on the day of Holi, the festival of colors, the boys decide not to attend classes.

The hostel superintendent Professor Singh (Naseeruddin Shah), the only lecturer with some links with the students, watches with apprehension their growing restlessness. A notice announcing a further postponement of examinations adds to the bitterness. A fight erupts out of nowhere between principal Phande's (Om Puri) nephew and another student; the principal's nephew is hurt and the other boy is promptly rusticated. This is seen as a drastic punishment, and the news spreads like wildfire to all the students of the college. Resistance is organized in the library, in the laboratory, in the classrooms and the college grounds as the students rebel against the principal. The principal calls professor Singh to give the name of the troublemakers but he refuses, the names are later given by one of the classmates and soon the boys are sent a suspension notice.

On their last day, the classmate is bullied and humiliated by the boys. The next day they find out that their classmate has committed suicide and the film ends with boys have taken in a police van while people dance to holi celebrate outside.

Songs
"Na Koi Kaam" - Aamir Khan
"Yeh Kaisa Safar Hai" - Aamir Khan

Production
Holi was shot mainly on the campus of the Film and Television Institute of India (FTII), Pune and Fergusson College, Pune. The iconic Fergusson College banyan tree had just fallen and Ketan Mehta, who had studied at Fergusson College, improvised and picturized a song with the main characters on the tree singing about the falling of a symbolic 'system'. This film was a part of the student project.

Cast
 Naseeruddin Shah as Professor Singh
 Aamir Khan as Madan Sharma (credited as Aamir Hussain)
 Meena Phatak as College Student Meenakshi
 Ashutosh Gowariker as Ranjeet Prakash
 Om Puri
 Shreeram Lagoo
 Deepti Naval as Professor Sehgal
 Paresh Rawal
 Dr. Sanjeev Gandhi
 Mohan Gokhale
 Rajendranath Zutshi
 Neeraj Vora
 Dina Pathak
 Kitu Gidwani
 Dilip Dhawan
 Himanshu Trivedi Ji
 Narendra Singh Arora

Reception
In 1985, the film was reviewed in The New York Times by American film critic Vincent Canby. He gave the film a generally favorable review, writing that the "film, which the production notes report was largely improvised, is very decently and exuberantly performed by the non-professional actors."

Awards
 1985: National Film Award for Best Cinematography: Jehangir Choudhary

References

External links

1984 films
Indian films based on plays
Films directed by Ketan Mehta
Films whose cinematographer won the Best Cinematography National Film Award
1980s Hindi-language films
Indian coming-of-age drama films
1980s coming-of-age drama films
1984 drama films